is a Japanese television drama series based on the manga series of the same name by Tsukasa Hojo. Takaya Kamikawa played as Ryō Saeba, Ayaka Miyoshi played as Xiang-Ying, and Saki Aibu played as Kaori Makimura. The theme song is "Save me" by Mariya Nishiuchi. It premiered on NTV on October 11, 2015. The first episode received a viewership rating of 12.5%.

Cast
 Takaya Kamikawa as Ryō Saeba 
 Ayaka Miyoshi as Xiang-Ying
 Saki Aibu as Kaori Makimura
 Reiko Takashima as Saeko Nogami 
 Shohei Miura as Liu Xin-Hong
 Brother Tom as Falcon

References

External links
  
 
 

Japanese drama television series
2015 in Japanese television
2015 Japanese television series debuts
2015 Japanese television series endings
Nippon TV dramas
Japanese television dramas based on manga